Ousmane Kanté (born 21 September 1989) is a professional footballer who plays as a defender for Ligue 2 club Paris FC. Born in France, he plays for Guinea national team.

Club career
Kanté began playing football at the age of 6 and joined the youth academy of US Créteil-Lusitanos. He spent his early career in the lower divisions of France. On 15 June 2018, he signed his first professional contract with Paris FC after playing a key role in promoting Béziers into the Ligue 2 in the 2017-18 season. He made his professional debut for Paris FC in a 1–1 Ligue 2 tie with Gazélec Ajaccio on 27 July 2018.

International career
Born in France, Kanté is of Guinean descent. He debuted for the Guinea national team in a 1–0 friendly loss to Comoros on 12 October 2019.

References

External links
 
 
 
 Foot-National Profile

1989 births
Living people
Footballers from Paris
Citizens of Guinea through descent
Guinean footballers
Guinea international footballers
French footballers
French sportspeople of Guinean descent
Association football defenders
Paris FC players
AS Béziers (2007) players
US Créteil-Lusitanos players
Ligue 2 players
Championnat National players
Championnat National 2 players
Championnat National 3 players
2021 Africa Cup of Nations players
Black French sportspeople